The pale November moth (Epirrita christyi) is a moth of the family Geometridae. The species was first described by Allen in 1906. It is a fairly common species in Western Europe including the British Isles.

This species is almost identical to its relatives the November moth ,  the small autumnal moth and the autumnal moth and it is almost impossible to identify them without examination of the genitalia. See Townsend et al. In general, although melanism occurs regularly in this species it is less prevalent than in the November moth. 

The pale November moth flies at night from September to November and is attracted to light.

The larva feeds on a variety of trees and shrubs (see list below). The species overwinters as an egg.

The flight season refers to the British Isles. This may vary in other parts of the range.

Recorded food plants 

Acer - maple
Betula - birch
Corylus - hazel
Crataegus - hawthorn
Fagus - beech
Prunus
Quercus - oak
Sorbus
Ulmus - elm

References 

Chinery, Michael Collins Guide to the Insects of Britain and Western Europe 1986 (Reprinted 1991)
Skinner, Bernard Colour Identification Guide to the Moths of the British Isles 1984

External links
Pale November at UKMoths
Fauna Europaea
Lepidoptera of Belgium
Lepiforum e.V.
De Vlinderstichting 

Epirrita
Moths described in 1906
Moths of Europe